"Sacrament of Wilderness" is the second single by Finnish symphonic metal band Nightwish, released as the first single from their album Oceanborn, and a split-single with Eternal Tears of Sorrow and Darkwoods My Betrothed.

The single's cover art features the owl with the same scroll as in the cover of Oceanborn and Wishmaster.

It reached the number-one spot in the Finnish charts during several weeks, as well as the subsequent, "Walking in the Air". Both were certified with Gold Disc in Finland with more than 5,000 sold copies.

The cover of the single features the same owl as in "Passion and the Opera".

Live performances 
The song disappeared from Nightwish' live setlist after their World Tour of the Century, in 2003, but returned again in late 2007, sung by their new vocalist Anette Olzon but otherwise the same musically. It is one of the few songs from their first two albums that has survived live and still is performed.

Former Nightwish bassist, Marko Hietala, doesn't like this song as much as he likes some others; when asked why, he said:

Track listing 
 "Sacrament of Wilderness" (performed by Nightwish)
 "Burning Flames' Embrace" (performed by Eternal Tears of Sorrow)
 "The Crow and the Warrior" (performed by Darkwoods My Betrothed)

Video 
The music video is a live performance of the song at Kitee, the band's hometown, on 13 November 1998. The band members, except Sami, sported short hair in the video, released as bonus material on Nightwish's first DVD, From Wishes to Eternity, in 2001.

Sales and certifications

Personnel 
Tarja Turunen – lead vocals
Tuomas Holopainen – keyboards
Emppu Vuorinen – lead guitar
Jukka Nevalainen – drums
Sami Vänskä – bass

References

External links 

Nightwish songs
1998 singles
Number-one singles in Finland
Songs written by Tuomas Holopainen
1998 songs
Spinefarm Records singles
Songs written by Emppu Vuorinen